Puračić  (Cyrillic: Пурачић) is a village in the municipality of Lukavac, Bosnia and Herzegovina.

Puračić is one of the most famous villages in Bosnia and Herzegovina. It is known for its popular fun fair.

Demographics 
According to the 2013 census, its population was 2,909.

References

Populated places in Lukavac